Hymenobacter roseus  is a Gram-negative bacterium from the genus of Hymenobacter which has been isolated from sand.

References

roseus
Bacteria described in 2014